Petra Boesler (later Wach, born 19 September 1955) is a German rower who competed for East Germany in the 1976 Summer Olympics.

She was born in Berlin. She is the sister of Martina Boesler, who is also an Olympic rower. Their aunt, Renate Boesler, won several medals at European Rowing Championships. Her aunt got her interested in rowing by taking her to regattas. Her aunt is married to the Olympic rower Wolfgang Gunkel.

In 1976 she and her partner Sabine Jahn won the silver medal in the double sculls event. In February 1978, she was given the sports awards Honored Master of Sports.

References

External links 
 

1955 births
Living people
People from East Berlin
Rowers from Berlin
East German female rowers
Olympic rowers of East Germany
Rowers at the 1976 Summer Olympics
Olympic silver medalists for East Germany
Olympic medalists in rowing
World Rowing Championships medalists for East Germany
Medalists at the 1976 Summer Olympics
Recipients of the Patriotic Order of Merit in bronze
Recipients of the Honoured Master of Sport